Sno-Core Compilation is a compilation album by Foil Records released on March 10, 1998. Inspired by the eponymous tour, this album includes popular names such as the Sublime, Blink 182, and Incubus along with many others.

Track listing

References

1998 compilation albums
Albums produced by Mark Trombino
Albums produced by John Feldmann
Albums produced by Jay Rifkin
Albums produced by John Avila